Shabab Al-Hussein is a Jordanian football club based in Amman, Jordan. This club was formed by a Palestinian refugee camp in Amman called Jabal el-Hussein camp.

Honors
Jordan FA Cup
Finalist : 2005
Jordan FA Shield
Finalist : 2000, 2003

Current squad

Current technical staff

Managerial History
  Nazar Ashraf
  Ra'ed Asfour
  Mohammad Al-Abourah
  Abdel-Rahman Idrees
  Ra'ed Assaf

Kit Providers
Adidas

External links
club home page

Football clubs in Jordan
Association football clubs established in 1954
1954 establishments in Jordan
Sport in Amman